Rahara is a locality in Khardaha Municipality of North 24 Parganas district in the Indian state of West Bengal. It is close to Kolkata and also a part of the area covered by Kolkata Metropolitan Development Authority (KMDA).

Geography

Education
 Rahara Ramakrishna Mission Boys' Home High School
 Rahara Bhabanath Institution for Girls
 Ramakrishna Mission Vivekananda Centenary College
 Kalyannagar Vidyapith
 Kalyannagar Vidyapith For Girls

Transport
Sodepur Road (Old Calcutta Road) passes through Rahara. It is also connected to B.T. Road.

Private Bus
 78/1 Rahara Bazar - Babughat

Train
Khardaha railway station on Sealdah-Ranaghat line is the nearest railway station.

References

External links

Cities and towns in North 24 Parganas district
Neighbourhoods in North 24 Parganas district
Neighbourhoods in Kolkata
Kolkata Metropolitan Area